The 2021 Israel State Cup Final decided the winner of the 2020–21 Israel State Cup, the 85th season of the Israel State Cup. It was played on 2 June 2021 at the Bloomfield Stadium in Tel Aviv, between city rivals Maccabi Tel Aviv and Hapoel Tel Aviv after it was initially planned to be held in the Sammy Ofer Stadium in Haifa.

Background
Hapoel Tel Aviv had previously played 24 Israel cup Finals, winning 16 of them. Their most recent appearance in the final was in 2012, in which they beat Maccabi Haifa 2–1 to win the State Cup. 

Maccabi Tel Aviv had previously played in 36 finals, winning 23 of them. Their most recent appearance in the final was in 2017, in which they lost 4–3 in a penalties shootout to Bnei Yehuda following a 0–0 score after extra time. Their most recent victory in the tournament was in 2015, in which they beat Hapoel Be'er Sheva 6–2 to win the cup.

Road to the final

Match

Details

References

Israel State Cup
State Cup
Cup 2021
Cup 2021
Israel State Cup matches